HRP may refer to:

Political parties
 Happiness Realization Party, a Japanese political party
 Haryana Republican Party, a political party in Haryana, India
 Human Rights Party (disambiguation)

Science, technology, and medicine
 Horseradish peroxidase, an enzyme used as a marker
 HRP Rescuer, an American helicopter
 Humanoid Robotics Project
 Human Research Program, a NASA program
 Special Programme on Human Reproduction (HRP), a World Health Organization endeavor

Other uses 
 Halifax Regional Police, in Halifax, Nova Scotia, Canada
 Hard Rock Park, now the Freestyle Music Park in Myrtle Beach, South Carolina, United States
 The Harvard Review of Philosophy
 Haute Randonnée Pyrénéenne, a hiking trail in France
 Historic Royal Palaces
 Human remains pouch, or body bag
 Human resource planning
 Hutchinson River Parkway and Expressway in New York City.
 Yandruwandha language, an Australian Aboriginal language